The Presidents Leadership Class (PLC) at the University of Colorado at Boulder is one of the oldest collegiate leadership programs in the United States.<ref name=Oldest>Roberts, Dennis C. Deeper Learning in Leadership : Helping College Students Find the Potential Within. San Francisco: Jossey-Bass, 2007., p. 30-31.</ref>  A four-year academic and experiential learning program for top students at the University of Colorado at Boulder, the Presidents Leadership Class was named to honor the president of the University of Colorado as well as the corporate presidents and executives involved in the program's formation.

History
The PLC program was founded and operated for 40 years as an independent non-profit organization in close partnership with the University of Colorado Boulder.  On July 1, 2012, PLC was officially adopted by the university as a fully integrated top scholar program.

Founded in 1972, the PLC began as a conversation between William A. Douglas, dean of admissions, and then assistant director of admissions, Terry Heineman.  Heineman had attended the University of Oklahoma, where he was involved with an undergraduate program similar to what PLC eventually became.  After many discussions, Heineman and Douglas thought it worthwhile to initiate a similar leadership program at CU Boulder as a recruitment strategy to attract and retain Colorado's top students.  Both felt it important to involve the outstanding leaders in the state to lend additional credibility to their concept.  This inclination led them to William Coors, chairman of the Coors Corporation.  These three, along with several other corporate and community leaders, moved forward and developed the Presidents Leadership Class, named in honor of the university president and the corporate presidents involved in the program's formation.

The first board of directors included very esteemed members of the university and surrounding community: William Coors, chairman of the Coors Corporation; Emmett Heitler, president of Samsonite Corporation; Theodore Brown, president of First National Bank of Denver; Frank Raggio, an executive at Martin-Marietta; Al Flanagan, president of Channel 9 and later president of Gannett Broadcasting; and William Douglas, dean of admissions, registrar, and financial aid at CU Boulder.

Membership
Each year, the Presidents Leadership Class selects up to 60 of the most exemplary freshman students attending the University of Colorado at Boulder.  Students wishing to become part of the Presidents Leadership Class apply to the program during their senior year of high school through the CU Boulder General Scholarship Application.  Applications are due every year on February 15.  PLC receives an average of 500 applications each year for the 50 positions for incoming freshman. PLC established a second-point-of-entry for rising sophomores in 2013 and has admitted at least two rising sophomores to the incoming cohort each year since.

The General CU Boulder Scholarship application consists of a detailed history of a student's academic record, test scores, community service, leadership roles, extracurricular activities and a general essay.  The PLC application additionally, requires three short essays, evidence of one creative achievement, one teacher/coach/supervisor/mentor recommendation, and one counselor recommendation.

From 500 applications, PLC selects 160 in-state students and between 25 and 30 out-of-state students to participate in interviews with a panel of judges composed of alumni, community leaders, parents of PLC students, and university officials.

Scholarships
Each year, 50 of the University of Colorado Boulder's most talented incoming students and select rising CU and transfer sophomores enter as PLC Scholars.  Each student is awarded $1,000 their first year in the program.  Once they have completed the first year, students become eligible for many other scholarships over the next three years of their undergraduate career.  Scholarships come from various sources including: the William A. Douglas Endowment, FirstBank, El Pomar Foundation, Ball Foundation, Cecil Walker and family, the Alvin Flanagan fund, the Hoelscher Memorial Scholarship, Annabelle K. Lutz Voss Scholars, the Van Lanschoot Family Scholarship, the Leo Hill Endowment, the Brian Watson Foundation, alumnus Tim Pestotnik and directly from the University of Colorado.

The program
PLC scholars receive four years of rigorous academic and experiential leadership development training, fostering both intellectual, personal and professional growth.  Scholars experience a multi-dimensional program that integrates academic course work, experiential learning, community impact projects, and involvement with industry and community leaders.  The various elements combine to encourage and develop the skills and character traits key to innovative success. Students who complete the PLC program requirements and complete the leadership capstone course receive a Leadership Studies Minor.

Results
In a recent survey, 91% of PLC alumni responded that PLC has helped them perform at a higher level in their career as compared to other college graduates.

Campus placement and board of advisors
The program operates within the Office of the Provost and under the supervision of the Associate Vice Chancellor for Undergraduate Education, Dr. Mary Krauss. The organization has a prestigious Board of Advocates who work closely with the director to raise awareness, support student achievement, and assist with fund raising and development for PLC. The board is made up of business and community leaders, PLC alumni, current students and includes both the university chancellor as well as other distinguished faculty from CU Boulder.

Alumni network
Founded in 1972, the Presidents Leadership Class boasts an active alumni network of more than 2000.  All PLC students are given access to this network to find jobs, mentors, and friends whenever desired.

Former speakers
Past speakers at PLC events have included:
 Dr. Jim Collins – bestselling author of Good to Great and Built to Last: Successful Habits of Visionary Companies.
 Katie Kramer – CEO Boettcher Foundation
 Supreme Court Justice Ruth Bader Ginsburg – current U.S. Supreme Court Justice
 Teju Ravilochan – co-founder and CEO of Uncharted (formerly Unreasonable Institute)
 Governor Richard Lamm – former governor of the State of Colorado.
 Senator Hank Brown – former United States Senator and president of the University of Colorado.
 Dr. Lloyd Lewan – dean emeritus, Semester at Sea.
 Dr. Steven Berman – past president, American Academy of Pediatrics.
 Sam Addoms – former CEO, Frontier Airlines.
 Barbara Grogan – founder, Western Industrial Contractors.
 Andrew Romanoff – former Speaker, Colorado House of Representatives.
 Neal Beidleman – PLC alumnus and featured character in Jon Krakauer's 1997 nonfiction book Into Thin Air'' about a harrowing Mount Everest climb.

References

University of Colorado Boulder